Astarte castanea, or the chestnut astarte, is a species of bivalve mollusc in the family Astartidae. It can be found along the Atlantic coast of North America, ranging from Nova Scotia to New Jersey.

References

Astartidae
Bivalves described in 1822